Rajinder is a given name. Notable people with the name include:

Rajinder Birdi or Roger Verdi (born 1953), retired English professional footballer
Rajinder Kaur Bhattal, Indian Congress politician
Rajinder Kaur Bulara (born 1946), Indian politician
Rajinder Dhawan or David Dhawan, Indian film director
Rajinder Garg (born 1966), Indian politician
Rajinder Ghai (born 1960), former Indian cricketer
Rajinder Goel (born 1942), former cricketer who holds the record for most wickets in Ranji Trophy
Rajinder Hans (born 1953), in Mumbai is a former Indian first class cricketer
Rajinder Krishan (1919–1988), Indian poet, lyricist and screenwriter
Rajinder Pal (born 1937), former Indian cricketer
Rajinder Paul Loomba, CBE (born 1943), philanthropist, founder and Executive Chairman of Rinku Group
Rajinder Rai (born 1975), British Indian musician
Rajinder Sachar (born 1923), Indian lawyer and a former Chief Justice of the Delhi High Court
Rajinder Singh (disambiguation), multiple people
Rajinder Singh (Sant Mat) (born 1946), head of Science of Spirituality and of the Sawan Kirpal Ruhani Mission
Rajinder Singh Bedi (1915–1984), Urdu writer, playwright and Hindi film director, screenwriter and dialogue writer
Rajinder Singh Sarkaria (1916–2007), Indian Supreme Court justice from 1973 to 1981

See also
Rajinder Nagar, posh residential neighborhood located in Central Delhi, India

Indian masculine given names